Aust-Telemark is a traditional district in Vestfold og Telemark county in Norway. The district comprises five municipalities: Hjartdal, Midt-Telemark, Nome, Notodden, and Tinn. The largest population centres in the region are the cities Notodden and Rjukan, of which Notodden is by far the largest with about 9,000 inhabitants. Hjartdal is scarcely populated.

Historically, the district was made up of the three munincipalities/parishes of Hjartdal, Tinn, and Heddal, which were created in 1837 when the formannskapsdistrikt laws came into effect. In 1860, Gransherad municipality was created from portions of Tinn and Hjartdal. Hovin municipality was created by a split from Gransherad in 1886, and Notodden by a split from Heddal in 1913. In 1964 Heddal and Gransherad were incorporated into Notodden whereas Hovin was incorporated into Tinn. More recently, the areas of Midt-Telemark and Nome have been included in Aust-Telemark as well, although they were historically included in the old Nedre Telemark district ("Lower Telemark"), but that district is not really used anymore in favor of the Grenland district name which has slightly different boundaries.

Notable people from Aust-Telemark include Myllarguten (1801-1872), legendary fiddler from Sauherad, Klaus Egge (1906-1979), composer from Gransherad and Hans Herbjørnsrud (born 1938), author from Heddal.

References

Districts of Vestfold og Telemark